Katalin É. Kiss (Debrecen, 31 May 1949)  is a Hungarian linguist. She is currently professor at the Research Institute for Linguistics of the Hungarian Academy of Sciences, in Budapest.

Education
She earned her PhD and her habilitation at the Hungarian Academy of Sciences, in 1979 and 1991, respectively.

Research
Between 1979 and 1986, she worked at the Faculty of Humanities of the Eötvös Loránd University. Her field of research includes generative Syntax, and Hungarian syntax. She is best known for her work on information structure and discourse configurationality, in Hungarian and other languages.

Recognition
É. Kiss has received a number of awards and honors, including the New Europe Prize, Princeton (1994), a Mellon Fellowship (Center for Advanced Study in the Behavioral Sciences, Stanford, 1992–1993), and membership in the Academy of Europe (since 2005). In 2021 she was elected a corresponding fellow of the British Academy.

She also serves on the editorial board of prestigious linguistics journals, such as:
 2010 –	editor of Acta Linguistica Hungarica; member of the editorial board since 1998
 2001 –	associate editor of Theoretical Linguistics
 1992 –	member of the editorial board of The Linguistic Review

Katalin É. Kiss also features twice as an example of orthography in the Chicago Manual of Style 16th edition (2010) which uses her name as an example of a Hungarian surname beginning with an initial "É. Kiss", not "Kiss". This kind of surname is categorized under the initial "É." in indexes, not under "K.". Hungarian names do not typically have middle names.

Family
Her father is the academician É. Kiss Sándor.

Key publications 
É. Kiss, Katalin. 1987. Configurationality in Hungarian. Springer.

É. Kiss, Katalin. 2010. Syntax of Hungarian. Cambridge University Press.

É. Kiss, Katalin (editor). 2005   Universal Grammar in the Reconstruction of Ancient Languages

References

External links 

 

Living people
1949 births
People from Debrecen
Members of the Hungarian Academy of Sciences
Linguists from Hungary
Women linguists